= Q Moses =

Visual artist and printmaker (born 1973)

Qaeqaho Moses Maraamele (b. 1973), colloquially known as Q Moses, is a San artist and printmaker. His work takes inspiration from San traditions, which he said he seeks to help preserve. In 2025 he won The No.1 Art Award, held at The Space Botswana art gallery.

In 1994, Qaeqhao Moses joined the Kuru Art Project in Botswana, where he developed his skills as a printmaker by learning from other artists. In 1996, he participated in the Thapong International Artists’ Workshop, and his linocut prints drew on San traditions, depicting wildlife, plant life, hunting and stories associated with the Kalahari.
